Events in the year 1709 in Norway.

Incumbents
Monarch: Frederick IV

Events
 April 22 - Hugo Octavius Accoramboni was given the title Marquis of Lista.
 October 22 – The Treaty of Copenhagen renews the alliance between the Russian Empire and Denmark-Norway after it had been destroyed in 1700 with the Peace of Travendal. Denmark-Norway re-enters the Great Northern War as a result.

Births
(cirka) – Hans Holtermann, businessman and landowner (d. 1781).

Deaths

Bjørn Frøysåk, farmer and merchant (born 1634).

See also

References